The Amdavad Municipal Corporation, or the AMC, established in July 1950 under the Bombay Provincial Corporation Act (1949), is responsible for the civic infrastructure and administration of the city of Ahmedabad.

History

On 21 April 1831, the collector of the city, Mr. Bordel formed 'Town Wall Fund Committee' comprising the citizens of Ahmedabad with aim of raising fund to repair and renovate the fort of Ahmedabad damaged in floods. The committee levied 1% tax on the sale of various commodities such as ghee. It raised 2 lakh rupees and repaired the fort.

The Ahmedabad Municipality was founded in 1873. The British Government nominated Ranchhodlal Chhotalal as the first president of the municipality on 15 September 1885. The republic municipality was formed on 1 April 1915. Bhaishankar Nanabhai was the first elected president of the municipality.

Ahmedabad Borough Municipality came into existence in 1925–26. In 1935, the city celebrated the centenary of Ahmedabad municipality.

Ahmedabad Municipality was upgraded to Amdavad Municipal Corporation in July 1950 under the Bombay Provincial Corporation Act, 1949. The designation of the mayor was formed instead of president. Chinubhai Chimanlal was the last president and the first mayor of the city.

Responsibilities
As per section 63 and 66 of the Bombay Provincial Municipal Corporation Act, the AMC is responsible for certain obligatory and discretionary services.

Obligatory services
 Erection of boundary of city defining city limits.
 Watering, Scavenging and Cleansing of all public streets and places
 Sewage services
 Drainage services
 Fire services
 Health & Medical services
 Street Lighting services
 Maintenance of a monuments & open spaces
 Identification of streets & houses
 Regulation and abatement of offensive and dangerous trades or practices
 Maintenance of burial houses and funeral homes
 Construction or acquisition of public markets and slaughter houses
 Construction or acquisition of cattle-pounds
 Primary education services
 Health and hygiene services
 Construction, maintenance and alternation of bridges
 Water supply services
 Preventing and checking the spread of dangerous diseases
 The securing or removal of dangerous buildings and places
 Construction of conservancy staff quarters
 Maintenance of relief works in scarcity

Discretionary services
 Construction and maintenance of maternity homes & infant welfare houses
 Maintenance of central laboratories
 Swimming pool and other public health services
 Tree plantation on road sides
 Construction and maintenance of public parks and gardens
 The holding of exhibition, athletics or games
 The maintenance of an ambulance services
 Construction and maintenance of theaters, community halls and museums etc.
 Building or purchase of staff quarters
 Construction and maintenance of public transport facilities
 Construction and maintenance of educational institutes
 Construction and maintenance of infirmaries and hospitals
 The destruction of animals and birds causing a nuisance
 Construction and maintenance of factory for the disposal of sewage
 The building or purchase and maintenance of suitable dwellings for the poor and working classes
 Provision of shelter to homeless persons and poor relief
 Surveys of buildings or lands
 Measures to meet any calamity affecting the public in the city any measure to promote public safety, health, convenience or instruction

Administration

The corporation is headed by a Municipal Commissioner, an IAS officer who is appointed by the Government of Gujarat. He discharges the executive power of the house.

For administrative purposes, the city is divided into seven zones — Central, East, West, North, South, North West, South West. Each zone is further divided into wards totaling 48 wards in seven zones. Each ward is represented by four corporators including minimum two women corporators. Thus 48 wards consist of 192 seats in total. An election is held to elect corporators to power. The mayor heads the party, with the largest number of corporators elected. The post of mayor is largely ceremonial, however.

Elections
The general elections for the elected wing of the corporation is held every five years, the last election being held in February 2021. The Bharatiya Janata Party secured a majority, winning 159 seats, with the second-place Indian National Congress winning 25, seven seats by AIMIM and one seat by an independent candidate.

References

External links
 Official website of the Ahmedabad Municipal Corporation
 Ahmedabad City Portal

Municipal corporations in Gujarat
1873 establishments in India
Government of Ahmedabad